Andrew Pratt (born 4 March 1975) is a former English cricketer. He was a left-handed batsman and a wicket-keeper for his team Durham for the seven years in which he played for them at first-class level.

Pratt ventured briefly into Twenty20 cricket in 2004, participating in the 2004 Twenty20 cup for Durham. He played in the Second XI championship in 2005 for Durham's second string side, thus going full-circle with his career, having originally played with Marylebone's Second XI along with his elder brother Neil. His other brother, the younger Gary has played cricket since 1998.
In 2012 after 7 years away from the game Pratt returned to play cricket for his home town club Crook Town CC.  He is now 1st team Captain and Head Junior coach at the Durham Cricket League Club and a member of the club committee.

External links
Andrew Pratt at Cricket Archive 

1975 births
English cricketers
Living people
Durham cricketers
Sportspeople from Bishop Auckland
Cricketers from County Durham